Logan Arens is an American actor. He is the brother of Cody Arens and Skye Arens. He is most notable for the voice of Littlefoot in The Land Before Time XIII: The Wisdom of Friends and as the roles of Jeremy, on The Education of Max Bickford and Chris on My Wife and Kids.

Career

Arens made his debut in Riding in Cars with Boys as Jason (age 3). Besides his most noted roles, he also played Arnie Davis in the TV movie Love's Enduring Promise, which was released in the United States on November 20, 2004. He also had a minor role in Happy Feet in 2006.

Filmography

References

External links
 

American male child actors
Living people
American male voice actors
American male television actors
1996 births